El Toqui mine is a zinc-gold mine in Chile.  Besides silver and lead are also mined in El Toqui. The mine is owned by Breakwater Resources through its wholly owned subsidiary company Sociedad Contractual Minera el Toqui.  The mine was purchased from Barrick Gold Corporation in 1997.

The mine is powered by a 4 Mw diesel power plant and a 2 Mw hydroelectric power plant.

See also
Mining in Chile
El Mochito mine
Nanisivik Mine

References

Zinc mines in Chile
Gold mines in Chile
Lead mines in Chile
Silver mines in Chile
Mines in Aysén Region
Underground mines in Chile